Pathari Dam, is an earthfill dam on local river near Barshi, Solapur district in the state of Maharashtra in India.

Specifications

Purpose
 Irrigation

See also
 Dams in Maharashtra
 List of reservoirs and dams in India

References

Dams in Solapur district
Dams completed in 1905
1905 establishments in India